A self-invested personal pension (SIPP) is the name given to the type of UK government-approved personal pension scheme which allows individuals to make their own investment decisions from the full range of investments approved by HM Revenue and Customs (HMRC).

SIPPs are "tax wrappers", allowing tax rebates on contributions in exchange for limits on accessibility. The HMRC rules allow for a greater range of investments to be held than personal pension schemes, notably equities and property. Rules for contributions, benefit withdrawal etc. are the same as for other personal pension schemes.  Another subset of this type of pension is the stakeholder pension scheme.

History
The rules and conditions for a broader range of investments were originally set out in Joint Office Memorandum 101 issued by the UK's Inland Revenue in 1989. However, the first true SIPP was taken out in March 1990. James Hay Partnership, the parent company of then Personal Pension Management, offered the first SIPP product. The second SIPP provider followed quickly afterwards and was called Provident Life, launching its own version a few months later. All three companies were based in Salisbury, Wiltshire where James Hay Partnership remained one of the largest SIPP providers.

The Finance Act 2004 implemented wide-ranging changes to the UK pensions regime, most of which came into force on 6 April 2006 (also known as A-Day) and is commonly referred to as pension simplification.

Structure
Unlike conventional personal pensions where the provider as trustee has ownership and control of the assets, in a SIPP the member may have ownership of the assets (via an individual trust) as long as the scheme administrator is a co-trustee to exercise control. In practice, most SIPPs do not work this way and simply have the provider as SIPP trustee.

The role of the scheme administrator in this situation is to control what is happening and to ensure that the requirements for tax approval continue to be met.

The pensions industry has gravitated towards four industry terms to describe generic SIPP types:

 Deferred. This is effectively a personal pension scheme in which most or all of the pension assets are generally held in insured pension funds (although some providers will offer direct access to mutual funds). Self-investment or income withdrawal activity is deferred until an indeterminate date, and this gives rise to the name. In some newer schemes of this type, there are over a thousand fund options, so they are not as restrictive as they once were.
 Hybrid. A scheme in which some of the assets must always be held in conventional insured pension funds, with the rest being able to be 'self-invested'. This has been a common offering from mainstream personal pension providers, who require insured funds in order to derive their product charges.
 Pure or full. Schemes offer unrestricted access to many allowable investment asset classes.
 SIPP Lite or Single Investment. A recent trend towards schemes that feature much lower fees for investments that are typically placed in only one asset. For these purposes, an investment platform or a stockbroker/discretionary fund manager account usually is classed as a single investment. An upgrade to a full SIPP in the future may be allowed, depending on the scheme.

Investment choice
Investors may make choices about what assets are bought, leased or sold, and decide when those assets are acquired or disposed of, subject to the agreement of the SIPP trustees (usually the SIPP provider).

All assets are permitted by HMRC, however some will be subject to tax charges. The assets that are not subject to a tax charge are: 

 Stocks and shares listed on a recognised exchange
 Futures and options traded on a recognised futures exchange
 Authorised UK unit trusts and open-ended investment companies and other UCITS funds
 Unauthorised unit trusts that do not invest in residential property
 Unlisted shares
 Investment trusts subject to FCA regulation
 Unitised insurance funds from EU insurers and IPAs
 Deposits and deposit interests
 Commercial property (including hotel rooms)
 Ground rents (as long as they do not contain any element of residential property)
 Traded endowments policies
 Derivatives products such as a contract for difference (CFD)
 Gold bullion, which is specifically allowed for in legislation, provided it is "investment grade"

Investments currently permitted by primary legislation but subsequently made subject to heavy tax penalties (and therefore typically not allowed by SIPP providers) include: 
 Any item of tangible movable property (whose market value does not exceed £6,000) – subject to further conditions on use of property
 "Exotic" assets like vintage cars, wine, stamps, and art
 Residential property

Tax treatment
Contributions to SIPPs are treated identically to contributions to other types of personal pension. Contributions are limited to £3,600 (£2,880 before 20% tax refund) or 100% of earned income (if higher). The maximum was £255,000 for the 2010/11 tax year but the 'Annual Allowance' for all pension contributions was decreased to £50,000 for tax years 2012/13 and 2013/14, and was decreased further to £40,000 starting with the 2014/15 tax year. The SIPP provider claims a tax refund at the basic rate on behalf of the customer (i.e. you pay £2,880 and your fund contribution for the year will become £3,600). The 20% is usually added to the 'pot' some 6–11 weeks after your payment is made. Higher rate and additional rate taxpayers must claim any additional tax refund through their tax return if they have one, or by otherwise contacting HMRC (being a higher rate taxpayer, being self-employed or having paid too much tax, are all triggers for being requested to complete a tax return).  Employer contributions are usually allowable against corporation tax or income tax.

Income from assets within the scheme is untaxed (although prior to the abolition of UK Dividend Tax Credit in April 2016, those credits could not be reclaimed). Growth is free from capital gains tax (CGT).

At any time after the SIPP holder reaches early retirement age (55 from April 2010) they may elect to take a pension from some or all of their fund. After taking up to 25% as a tax-free Pension Commencement Lump Sum, the remaining money can either be moved into 'drawdown' (where it remains invested) or used to purchase an annuity. Drawdown income may be "capped", typically limited to that obtainable with an annuity according to the Government Actuary's Department (GAD). This is reviewed every three years until age 75 and annually thereafter. This limit does not apply to plan holders in "Flexi Access Drawdown", who may take any amount from their fund from age 55. Pension income is taxed as if it is earned income at the member's highest marginal rate.

Rules exist to prevent the Pension Commencement Lump Sum being recycled back into the SIPP (and neither drawdown nor annuity payments count as earned income for the purpose of making SIPP contributions).

If the fund value exceeds the lifetime allowance, the amount above the lifetime allowance will be taxed at 55%. The lifetime allowance was £1.8 million in the 2010–11 and 2011-12 tax years. From April 2012 the lifetime allowance fell to £1.5 million but there are provisions for those previously relying on the higher limit. In the Chancellor's 2012 Autumn Statement, it was confirmed that the lifetime allowance would fall further, to £1.25 million from 6 April 2014 (again with the option of certain individuals being able to claim the previous level of lifetime allowance). In March 2015, a further reduction to £1 million was announced from 6 April 2016, with the allowance to be adjusted for inflation, based on the Consumer Price Index, starting in 2018.

SIPPs can borrow up to 50% of the net value of the pension fund to invest in any assets.

See also
 Individual savings account

Notes

External links

Investment
Pensions in the United Kingdom
1990 introductions
1990 establishments in the United Kingdom
Tax-advantaged savings plans in the United Kingdom